The 2008 FIU Golden Panthers football team represented Florida International University in the 2008 NCAA Division I FBS football season. The team was coached by Mario Cristobal and played their homes games at the on-campus FIU Stadium.

Regular season
The 2008 season started off with a loss at 13th-ranked Kansas, 40–10. Following that, Iowa routed FIU, 42–0. FIU then faced its highest-ranked opponent in school history, 12th-ranked South Florida, for the inaugural game of the new FIU Stadium. Trailing 17-0 with 2:30 left in the game FIU attained a safety, and subsequently scored a touchdown. FIU lost, 17–9, but played acted as a spoiler for South Florida, with the latter falling three spots in the rankings. The game against Toledo became their first-ever out-of-conference FBS win. Against, Toledo, FIU forced four turnovers and recorded its first road win since 2005.

Schedule

Coaching staff

See also
 FIU Golden Panthers football
 FIU Golden Panthers
 FIU Stadium
 FIU

Game summaries

Kansas
Overall: (0-1), Conference: (0-2)

Iowa
Overall: (0-2), Conference: (0-0)

South Florida
Overall: (0-3), Conference: (0-0)

Toledo
Overall: (1-3), Conference: (0-0)

North Texas
Overall: (2-3), Conference: (1-0)

Middle Tennessee
Overall: (3-3), Conference: (2-0)

Troy
Overall: (3-4), Conference: (2-1)

Louisiana-Lafayette
Overall: (3-5), Conference: (2-2)

Arkansas State
Overall: (4-5), Conference: (3-2)

Louisiana-Monroe

Florida Atlantic
Shula Bowl

Western Kentucky

References

FIU
FIU Panthers football seasons
FIU Golden Panthers football